Falling from Grace refers to an angel being banished from heaven, becoming a fallen angel. It can also refer to:

Falling from Grace (film), a 1992 film
Falling from Grace (EP), an EP by The Gentle Waves
Falling from Grace (novel), a children's mystery novel by Jane Godwin

See also 
Fall from grace (disambiguation)